Say No More is the ninth studio album recorded by British rock band Badfinger that contained new material. Issued in January 1981 on Radio Records, the LP was the second and last reunion by Tom Evans and Joey Molland, after the death of band founder Pete Ham in 1975. The album was recorded in Miami, Florida, by Evans, Molland, pianist and organist Tony Kaye (formerly of Yes), guitarist Glen Sherba and drummer Richard Bryans and was co-produced by Jack Richardson.

Kaye had been invited to join the band by Evans after Airwaves, as the two had been friends. Kaye later reflected on the album, "I really kind of like that album. It had a certain something. Of course, we recorded it in Miami. The band was living in a house on Key Biscayne. There was a lot of drinking and stuff going on. But the band was performing in the studio and we’d go and play a bar in Key Biscayne after we finished. We became very close, actually."

Rockier than its predecessor Airwaves, this final outing by Badfinger produced one semi-successful single with the song "Hold On", which reached  on the US Billboard charts in 1981. The album peaked at only  on the US Billboard albums chart. It featured cover art by artist Peter Max. The album was not given an official release in the UK.

Evans' song "Rock 'N' Roll Contract" had originally been recorded for the band for the Head First album, but that album was still unreleased at the time of Say No More.

Most CD releases reverse the order of the last two songs, but keep the titles in the right order. "No More" runs 4:29, and "Crocadillo" runs 3:21.

Track listing
Side one
"I Got You" (Joey Molland) – 3:39
"Come On" (Tom Evans) – 3:24
"Hold On" (Evans/Joe Tansin) – 3:24
"Because I Love You" (Molland) – 2:49
"Rock 'N' Roll Contract" (Evans) – 5:37

Side two
"Passin' Time" (Molland) – 3:30
"Three Time Loser" (Molland) – 3:30
"Too Hung Up on You" (Evans) – 3:21
"No More" (Molland) – 4:29
"Crocadillo" (Evans/Rod Roach) – 3:21

Personnel
Tom Evans – bass, guitar, vocals
Joey Molland – guitar, piano, vocals
Glenn Sherba – guitar
Tony Kaye – organ, piano
Richard Bryans – drums

Charts

References

Badfinger albums
1981 albums
Albums produced by Jack Richardson (record producer)